Natalie Bassingthwaighte (born 1 September 1975) is an Australian recording artist, actress, and television personality. Born and raised in Wollongong, New South Wales, she began her career in musical theatre. She later pursued an acting career in 1998 with guest appearances in television shows. Bassingthwaighte rose to prominence in 2003 on the Australian soap opera Neighbours for her role as Izzy Hoyland, which earned her three Logie Award nominations.

In 2004, she was recruited as the lead singer of Australian electro-pop band, Rogue Traders. After leaving Neighbours in 2006 to focus on her music career, Bassingthwaighte released a cover of "Don't Give Up" with Shannon Noll, which peaked at number two on the ARIA Singles Chart and was certified platinum. In 2008, she left Rogue Traders to pursue her solo music career. Bassingthwaighte released her debut solo album 1000 Stars in 2009, which spawned the platinum top-ten hits "Alive" and "Someday Soon". The album was a commercial success, debuting at number one on the ARIA Albums Chart and was certified gold. After seven years away from the Rogue Traders, Bassingthwaighte returned as the band's lead singer in 2015.

Aside from her acting and music career, Bassingthwaighte co-wrote her first book, Sistahood: A Journal of Self-Discovery, with her younger sister in 2008. That same year, she made her debut as a television presenter, hosting So You Think You Can Dance Australia for its first three seasons, which earned her another three Logie Award nominations. From 2011 to 2014, she was a judge and mentor on The X Factor Australia, and briefly joined The X Factor New Zealand in 2015. That same year, Bassingthwaighte launched her own children's clothing label, Chi Khi. Bassingthwaighte has been married twice; in 1998 she married Graham Wilmott, a chef from Wollongong, for two years. In December 2011, she married her former Rogue Traders bandmate Cameron McGlinchey. The couple have two children, a daughter named Harper Rain Sinclair McGlinchey and a son named Hendrix John Hickson McGlinchey.

Early life

Natalie Bassingthwaighte was born on 1 September 1975 in Wollongong, New South Wales, to Betty (born ca. 1953) and Michael Bassingthwaighte (AM) (born ca. 1952). Betty has worked as a theatre nurse. Since 1982 Michael has worked as the CEO of a health care insurance provider. Bassingthwaighte grew up in the suburb of Mount Warrigal as the second of four girls with her older sister Melinda (born ca. 1974) and the twins, Lisa and Nicole (born ca. 1982). From a young age, she used to charge 20 cents for family and friends to come and see her dress up and put on mini concerts. Bassingthwaighte got her first role in a primary school production at Balarang Primary School of Peter Pan, playing the character Tinker Bell. She enrolled at Wollongong High School of the Performing Arts and graduated from the Australian College of Entertainment.

After college, Bassingthwaighte successfully auditioned for a job at a theme park, Wonderland Sydney. She participated in a variety of performances, including 1950s, 1970s, country and Hanna-Barbera shows. After working at Wonderland Sydney, Bassingthwaighte performed for two seasons as lead vocalist and stand-up comic at the Kaos Comedy Theatre restaurant in Sydney. During that time she auditioned for other musicals. Bassingthwaighte was chosen from over 6,000 people for the role as Mrs. Cohen in the Australian tour of the rock musical, Rent (1999). During Rent's tour, she auditioned for another stage production, Chicago. The casting directors were initially dubious given that she was not an A-List dancer, however she won the role of June and understudied the principal role of Roxie Hart. On the way there they became lost and their 4WD broke down; they were rescued by a Navy helicopter. Her first lead role was in the Asian production Chang & Eng, which depicts the biography of the first Siamese twins; Bassingthwaighte portrayed Adelaide Yates in both the Singapore and Bangkok seasons of the show.

Music career

2004–08: Rogue Traders

Bassingthwaighte had considered a music career for some years and had been a member of an R&B group, but it did not work out, and her interest focused on other options. By 2004, she had begun working on her own demos: songs with an acoustic-rock sound and, later that year, she was recruited as the lead singer for Australian electro-pop band, Rogue Traders. Formed in 2002 with James Ash on keyboards and Steve Davis on guitars, the group had used a variety of guest vocalists and issued a debut album before seeking a permanent singer. After being presented with the band's music, Bassingthwaighte auditioned for Ash and Davis. The pair had auditioned 15 to 20 candidates, and after she performed their song "Voodoo Child", she became the band's front-woman.

In May 2005, the band released "Voodoo Child" as their fifth single—the first with Bassingwaighte—which reached number four on the ARIA Singles Chart and was certified platinum for shipments of 70,000 units in Australia. "Voodoo Child" also reached number seven on the New Zealand Singles Chart, number three on the UK Singles Chart and number fifteen on the Irish Singles Chart. The single won the award for "Best Dance Video" at the 2006 MTV Australia Awards. The follow-up singles "Way to Go!" and "Watching You" also reached the ARIA top ten and both were certified gold for shipment of 35,000 units. In October 2005, Bassingthwaighte performed the Australian national anthem at the 2005 NRL Grand Final. Also that month Rogue Traders issued their second studio album, Here Come the Drums, which reached number two on the ARIA Albums Chart and spent a total of seventy-four weeks in the Top 50. It was certified 4× platinum and became their most successful album. The album received four nominations at the ARIA Music Awards of 2006 for "Breakthrough Artist – Album", "Best Pop Release", "Highest Selling Album" and "Best Group".

While Bassingthwaighte was still a member of Rogue Traders, she also made solo appearances and releases. In December 2006 she performed a duet with label mate Shannon Noll on their cover version of Peter Gabriel and Kate Bush's "Don't Give Up", for the various artists' album Home: Songs of Hope & Journey. Noll and Bassingthwaighte's version reached number two on the ARIA Singles Chart. She recorded "O Holy Night" for the album The Spirit of Christmas 2006, a Christmas compilation album for which all proceeds go to The Salvation Army in Australia. In 2007 Bassingthwaighte and Noll teamed up again for "Please Come Home for Christmas" on the album, The Spirit of Christmas 2007.

In October 2007 Rogue Traders released their third album, Better in the Dark, which spawned the hit singles "Don't You Wanna Feel" and "I Never Liked You"—both were certified gold, and "What You're On". The album debuted on the ARIA Albums Chart at number four and gained a platinum accreditation. For this album, Bassingthwaighte is credited as a co-composer for five of its twelve tracks, including all three singles. She worked with Ash and his wife Melinda Appleby on some tracks, "[w]e'd sit in a room and throw ideas around … It was interesting that all three of us instinctively knew when we had a great idea". At the APRA Awards of 2009, "Don't You Wanna Feel" was nominated as Dance Work of the Year. In June 2008, Bassingthwaighte left the group to pursue her solo career. She had signed a recording contract with Sony Music Australia in 2006 to embark on a solo career. In November 2009, Rogue Traders recruited Mindi Jackson as her replacement.

2008–present: 1000 Stars and subsequent ventures

In June 2008, Bassingthwaighte began working on her debut solo album, 1000 Stars. In October 2008, the album's lead single, "Alive", was released; it peaked at number eight on the ARIA Singles Chart and gained a platinum certificate. In January 2009, a second single, "Someday Soon", was issued which became Bassingthwaighte's third top-ten single on the ARIA Charts and was also certified platinum. The album was released on 20 February 2009, which debuted on the ARIA Albums Chart at number one and was certified gold.

In April 2009, the album's title track was released as the third single. It reached number thirty on the ARIA Singles Chart. "Not For You" was released in July 2009 as the fourth single and it failed to chart. The fifth single, "Love Like This", appeared in January 2010, which reached the Top 100. It was used to raise awareness by the Aids Council of New South Wales for the 'Wear It With Pride' T-shirt campaign in the lead-up to that year's Sydney Mardi Gras parade. For 1000 Stars, Bassingthwaighte co-composed seven of its fifteen tracks, including "Alive" and "Someday Soon".

In January 2011, Bassingthwaighte returned to theatre, performing at the Sydney Opera House, in Love, Loss and What I Wore, a play "about women, their relationships and memories", where she co-starred with Judi Farr, Mirrah Foulkes, Amanda Muggleton and Magda Szubanski. On 28 August 2011, Bassingthwaighte told The Daily Telegraph that she had recorded several new tracks, with her single "All We Have" expected to be released soon. She said, "Everything is coming together … I did lose my mojo for a while, I just didn't believe in doing something unless you're totally up for it. I wasn't feeling creative and then, suddenly, it was Christmas and it just felt right". "All We Have" was released in September 2011 and it failed to chart. In February 2012, Bassingthwaighte was announced as a Moomba Monarch alongside Harry Kewell, the Australian socceroo. In December 2014, Bassingthwaighte and other Australian singers recorded a cover version of Kate Bush's "This Woman's Work" under the name "Hope for Isla and Jude", and released it as a charity single to help raise funds for two siblings who suffer from the rare disease Sanfilippo syndrome. In September 2015, Bassingthwaighte reunited with her former band Rogue Traders, performing together for the first time in seven years, at a corporate show in Gold Coast. They later reunited again in December for a New Year's Eve show, where they hinted at the possibility of future shows, and confirmed that Bassingthwaighte's former replacement Mindi Jackson had given the band's reunion her blessing.

Television and film career

Acting
Bassingthwaighte's first television role as an actress was in a 1998 episode of the hospital-based drama series All Saints. In 2000, she had a guest appearance in an episode of The Lost World, playing the role of Raina. In 2003, Bassingthwaighte appeared in the telemovie Counterstrike, playing the character of Kelly. The following year, she filmed a part in Rohan Spong's student film When Darkness Falls. She portrayed the character of Jinx De-Luxe, which involved a performance of the Marilyn Monroe song "Every Baby Needs a Da-da-daddy". She gained greater popular acclaim on the Australian soap opera Neighbours, playing the role of Izzy Hoyland from 2003 to 2006. This was her first full-time television role. Upon securing the role, she relocated from Sydney to Melbourne. Bassingthwaighte was nominated for a Gold Logie Award for Most Popular Personality and a Silver Logie Award for Most Popular Actress in 2006, for her role on the show. Bassingthwaighte left Neighbours in 2006 to focus on her music career and filmed her final scenes on 2 June 2006. In March 2007, she reprised her role as Izzy Hoyland in scenes shot while on location in London in November 2006. Bassingthwaighte received another nomination for Most Popular Actress at the 2007 Logie Awards. Bassingthwaighte appeared in a documentary special celebrating the show's 30th anniversary titled Neighbours 30th: The Stars Reunite, which aired in Australia and the United Kingdom in March 2015. She reprised her role as Izzy Hoyland for a guest appearance on Neighbours in February 2018, and was again back for the final episodes of the series in 2022.

In 2009, Bassingthwaighte starred in the Australian horror film Prey alongside Jesse Johnson, Christian Clark and Nicholas Bell, playing the role of Kate, an ambitious young surgeon working in the emergency department of a major city hospital. Part of the plot concerned three couples who become lost in outback Western Australia—Bassingthwaighte remembered similarities to her trip to The Pinnacles. The film was directed by George T. Miller and grossed $744 at the box office in Australia. In 2010, for a DVD release in the U.S., it was re-titled as The Outback. From April to June 2010, Bassingthwaighte starred in the 13-part television crime mini-series, Underbelly: The Golden Mile, playing the role of Maria Haken, the wife of Trevor Haken, who is a corrupt Kings Cross detective. The Hakens are a real-life couple, where the husband, Trevor, became an informant and witness at the Wood Royal Commission into police corruption. Bassingthwaighte's character was described as "the adulterous and neglected wife" and her husband's "drinking and neglect led [her] to begin an affair with another police officer". In 2016, Bassingthwaighte starred in the two-part miniseries Brock, based on the life of Australian motor racing driver Peter Brock, playing the role of Julie Bamford, Brock's girlfriend before he died. In September 2017, she appeared in the second season of the drama series The Wrong Girl, playing the recurring role of pastry chef Gillian.

Reality television
In 2008, Bassingthwaighte made her debut as a television presenter, hosting the Australian version of So You Think You Can Dance. She hosted the show for its first three seasons and received two nominations at the 2009 Logie Awards for a Gold Logie Award for Most Popular Personality and a Silver Logie Award for Most Popular Presenter. She received another nomination for Most Popular Presenter at the 2010 Logie Awards. In 2011, Bassingthwaighte replaced Natalie Imbruglia as a judge and mentor on the third season of The X Factor Australia. She also returned for the show's fourth, fifth and sixth seasons. In 2015, Bassingthwaighte replaced Natalia Kills midway through the second season of The X Factor New Zealand after Kills was fired from the show for humiliating a contestant. In 2017, she became a contestant on the third season of the reality series I'm a Celebrity...Get Me Out of Here! Australia, where she competed for her chosen charity, the Sister2Sister program for the Life Changing Experiences Foundation. Bassingthwaighte made it to the show's grand finale and placed third in the competition.

Theatre

Other ventures
In April 2008, Bassingthwaighte released her first book, Sistahood: A Journal of Self-Discovery. It was co-written, over two years, with her younger sister Nicole Moore, and is aimed at boosting teen and pre-teen girls' self-esteem. The book features activities and is filled with pictures of Bassingthwaighte's life with her three sisters: Moore, Lisa Fogarty and Melinda Sheldrick. In March–April 2012, Bassingthwaighte travelled to Bangladesh as an ambassador for Vicks Australia and Save the Children's project, Breathe for Life, which highlighted pneumonia-infected children and their parents' inability to afford health care. She encouraged fellow Australians to support the project to train health workers, village doctors and caregivers and reduce the impact of pneumonia. In March 2015, Bassingthwaighte launched her own children's clothing label, Chi Khi. The collection features natural bamboo cotton fabrics and clothing for both boys and girls aged zero to four. It was made available to buy online from 2 March 2015.

Personal life

Bassingthwaighte is often referred to as Nat Bass in the media and by fans. At , she is described as "pint-sized" and "tiny". During adolescence, Bassingthwaighte was bullied at school about her body shape and lack of development. In late 1998, she married Graham Wilmott, a chef from Wollongong; the couple were together for two years.

In 2010, Bassingthwaighte and her long-time boyfriend Cameron McGlinchey had a daughter weighing 3.22 kg at a private Melbourne hospital. Bassingthwaighte and McGlinchey were married on 4 December 2011. In 2013, she gave birth to their second child, a son.

Discography

Studio albums

With Rogue Traders
 Here Come the Drums (2005)
 Better in the Dark (2007)

Solo

Singles

Charity singles

Music videos

Filmography

Awards and nominations

Notes

References

External links

 

 
1975 births
21st-century Australian actresses
21st-century Australian dancers
21st-century Australian women singers
Australian dance musicians
Australian film actresses
Australian house musicians
Australian musical theatre actresses
Australian soap opera actresses
Australian sopranos
Australian stage actresses
Australian television actresses
Australian television presenters
Australian women in electronic music
Australian women television presenters
I'm a Celebrity...Get Me Out of Here! (Australian TV series) participants
Living people
Musicians from New South Wales
People from Wollongong
Rogue Traders members
Sony Music Australia artists